The list of aircraft carriers by configuration contains active aircraft carriers organized by the specific configuration of aircraft carrier designs. This list excludes seaplane carriers or helicopter carriers.

Carrier configurations
There are three main configurations of aircraft carrier in service in the worlds navies:
 Catapult Assisted Take-Off But Arrested Recovery (CATOBAR)
 Short Take-Off But Arrested Recovery (STOBAR)
 Short Take-Off Vertical Landing (STOVL)

Navies with CATOBAR carriers
Chinese Navy
Type 003 – under construction
French Navy
FS Charles de Gaulle
Indian navy
INS Vishal - Planned ( in Design Phase)
United States Navy

 *(equipped with EMALS)
 *

Navies with STOBAR carriers
Chinese Navy
 Type 001
Liaoning
 Type 002
Shandong
Indian Navy
Modified Kiev class
INS Vikramaditya
Vikrant class
INS Vikrant – In Trials
Russian Navy
Kuznetsov class
Admiral of the Fleet of the Soviet Union Kuznetsov

Navies with STOVL carriers

Italian Navy
Cavour
Giuseppe Garibaldi
Trieste – under construction

 Japan Maritime Self-Defense Force
 Izumo class – to be converted to operate F-35B aircraft
Royal Navy
Queen Elizabeth class
HMS Queen Elizabeth
HMS Prince of Wales 
Spanish Navy
SNS Juan Carlos I
United States Navy
Wasp class
America class

See also
 List of amphibious warfare ships
 List of aircraft carriers
 List of aircraft carriers in service
 Timeline for aircraft carrier service
 List of aircraft carriers by country
 Helicopter Carrier

References

Type